Sainte-Rose is a provincial electoral district in Quebec, Canada that elects members to the National Assembly of Quebec. It is located within the city of Laval, Quebec.

It was created for the 2012 election from parts of Fabre and Vimont electoral districts.

Including its predecessor ridings (Vimont from 1981 to 2012 and Fabre before that), Sainte-Rose has voted for the governing party in every election since 1970.

Members of the National Assembly

Election results

 2014 reference:

^ Change is from redistributed results; CAQ change is from ADQ

References

External links
Information
 Elections Quebec

Maps
 2011 map (PDF)
2001–2011 changes to Fabre (Flash)
2001–2011 changes to Vimont (Flash)
 Electoral map of Laval region
 Quebec electoral map, 2011 

Quebec provincial electoral districts
Politics of Laval, Quebec